Yellow Creek is a stream in Berrien County, in the U.S. state of Michigan. It is a tributary to Blue Creek.

Yellow Creek was so named on account of the yellowish hue of the water.

References

Rivers of Berrien County, Michigan